Staunton Township (S T7N R6W) is located in Macoupin County, Illinois, United States. As of the 2010 census, its population was 5,795 and it contained 2,611 housing units.

Geography

Demographics

Adjacent townships
 Mount Olive Township (north)
 Walshville Township, Montgomery County (east)
 New Douglas Township, Madison County (southeast)
 Olive Township, Madison County (south)
 Dorchester Township (west)

References

External links
US Census
City-data.com
Illinois State Archives

Townships in Macoupin County, Illinois
Townships in Illinois